Praskov′ja Georgievna Parchomenko (1886–1970) was a Soviet astronomer who discovered many minor planets between the years of 1930–1940.

Career 
Parchomenko first discovered 1129 Neujmina on 8 August 1929 at the Simeiz Observatory. Less than a year later, Parchomenko discovered 1166 Sakuntala on June 27, 1930, only two nights before Karl Reinmuth viewed it.

Legacy 
On 30 August 1970, Tamara Smirnova discovered 1857 Parchomenko which was named in honour of Parchomenko.

References 
 Балышев М.А. Историко-биографическое исследование жизни и творчества украинского астронома Прасковьи Георгиевны Пархоменко. Наука та наукознавство. 2018. №1. С. 114-137. 

Soviet astronomers
1886 births
1970 deaths
Women astronomers
Soviet women scientists